Scytodes thoracica is a spitting spider, so called because it spits a venomous sticky silken substance over its prey. The carapace is unusual in sloping upwards towards its rear end, whereas the abdomen slopes downwards.

It has six eyes instead of the eight spiders usually have. It has a wide distribution:  found in "Europe, North Africa, Turkey, temperate Asia to China, Korea, Japan. Introduced to North America, Argentina, India, Australia, New Zealand."

This particular spitting spider features the presence of silk glands in its cephalothorax. Besides the silk glands in its abdomen, the spider also has silk glands connected with its venom glands. In this way the spider has the ability to make venomous silk. Other arachnids may also have silk glands in their cephalothorax, such as the pseudoscorpions.

Hunting tactics

In contrast to the pseudoscorpions that use the silk from the cephalothorax glands to make nests, the spitting spider uses it to catch prey in a very particular way. It is a very slow hunter as its long and tender legs may suggest. During night, when some insects are less active, Scytodes starts its hunt. Then it squeezes the back of its body together and spits two silk threads, in 1/600 s, in a zigzag manner over the victim. The prey is immediately immobilized. When the prey is larger the spider spits several times. It is assumed the spider uses special long hearing hairs located at its legs to locate its prey.

Habitat
Scytodes thoracica is nocturnal. It prefers warm temperatures and is not rare inside houses. In Southern Europe, it can be found under stones outside houses. In Northern Europe it can only be found in houses. They can be found worldwide.

Reproduction
The mother makes a nursery web for the emerged spiderlings, and carries her eggs under her belly in a net of silk.

References

External links
 Photographs of Scytodes thoracica
 Info and pictures of Scytodes thoracica

Scytodidae
Spiders described in 1802
Spiders of Asia
Spiders of Europe
Spiders of New Zealand